Valérie Lagrange (born 25 February 1942) is a French actress and singer. She starred in the 1960 adventure film Morgan, the Pirate.

Selected filmography 
 The Green Mare (1959)
 Morgan, the Pirate (1960)
 The Corsican Brothers (1961)
 Hardi Pardaillan! (1964)
 Up to His Ears (1965)
 A Man and a Woman (1966)
 My Love, My Love (1967)
 Weekend (1967)
 Satyricon (1969 Polidoro film)
 La Vallée (1972)
 My Nights Are More Beautiful Than Your Days (1989)
 Queen to Play (2009)
 On My Way (2013)

Bibliography 
 Hughes, Howard. Cinema Italiano: The Complete Guide from Classics to Cult. I.B.Tauris, 2011.

References

External links  

 

1942 births
Living people
French film actresses
Actresses from Paris
20th-century French actresses
21st-century French actresses
French women singers
French television actresses